is a Japanese judoka and Wrestler. Her older brother, placed second in the over 100 kg division at the 2015 World Judo Juniors Championships.

Biography
She started Judo at the age of 5, influenced by her father, who had Judo and Sumo experiences. 
She also wrestled from ages 10 to 17.
After entering International Pacific University in 2017, she was coached by Toshihiko Koga, a gold medalist at the Barcelona Olympics.  
In 2018, she won the gold medal in the mixed team event at the Asian Games held in Jakarta, Indonesia. In 2019, she won the gold medal in the women's –70kg event at the Asian-Pacific Judo Championships held in Fujairah, United Arab Emirates. Then, she won the gold medal in the women's middleweight (–70kg) event at the 2019 Summer Universiade held in Naples, Italy. She also won the gold medal in the women's team event.

After graduating from university in 2021, she became a member of The East Japan Railway Company's Judo club. At the 2021 Judo Grand Slam Abu Dhabi held in Abu Dhabi, United Arab Emirates, she won the silver medal in her event. In December 2021, She won the All-Japan Judo Championships while being a 70 kg athlete.
She won the gold medal in her event at the 2022 Judo Grand Slam Tel Aviv held in Tel Aviv, Israel.

References

External links
 
 
 

Living people
1998 births
Place of birth missing (living people)
Japanese female judoka
Japanese female sport wrestlers
Universiade medalists in judo
Universiade gold medalists for Japan
Medalists at the 2019 Summer Universiade
Judoka at the 2018 Asian Games
Asian Games gold medalists for Japan
Asian Games medalists in judo
Medalists at the 2018 Asian Games
21st-century Japanese women